Blackburn is a town in West Lothian, Scotland, near both Bathgate and Livingston, two of the larger towns in the county.

History 

Blackburn means "the black stream", from the Old English blæc "black" and burna "stream". The name was recorded as Blachebrine in 1152. As a small industrial centre, Blackburn originally developed as a cotton-manufacturing town. In the mid-19th century, it became a centre for coal mining.

Its small population expanded rapidly from 4,302 in 1961 to around 9,000 by 1965 as a result of employment opportunities in Bathgate to the north and through in-migration following the inception of the Glasgow Overspill Plan.

The closure of the British Leyland plant in 1986 brought decline to the area, along with the destruction of many homes built during the 1960s.

The railway station at Bathgate attracts commuters to live in Blackburn and provides easy access to both Glasgow and Edinburgh.

Blackburn House
Blackburn House is a category A-listed Georgian building, situated to the east of the town.

Churches

Blackburn and Seafield Parish Church (Church of Scotland) is located in Blackburn. The congregation celebrated its centenary in 2008.  Blackburn Gospel Hall (Christian Brethren) meets for worship services and Bible studies in a well-kept church building originally constructed as Blackburn's village school in the late 18th century. Our Lady of Lourdes, a Roman Catholic church located in Blackburn, also serves neighbouring communities and partners with a branch of the St. Vincent de Paul Society.

Educational facilities 

The village has the Roman Catholic secondary St. Kentigern's Academy, which serves students from the surrounding areas of West Lothian.

The village also houses three primary schools: Murrayfield Primary, Our Lady of Lourdes Primary and Blackburn Primary as well as Pinewood School, a combination primary/secondary additional needs school.

Formerly the village had its own Blackburn Academy, a non-denominational secondary school that also served students from the surrounding areas of West Lothian. However, the academy was closed in 1992 after several new non-denominational high schools had opened in nearby Livingston.

Climate

Sport

Football
Blackburn is home to Scottish football club Blackburn United who play at the Purdie Worldwide Community Stadium (New Murrayfield Park) near the centre of the town and compete in the East of Scotland Football League Premier Division. The Club forms the pinnacle of the Blackburn United Community Sports Club.

Taekwondo
Blackburn is a big part of Scotia TaeKwonDo, with national competitions regularly held in the Blackburn Community Centre which is adjacent to New Murrayfield Park. Classes are also a big part of the Taekwondo activity in the area.

Famous natives
Susan Boyle, singer who first came to fame as a contestant on Britain's Got Talent and whose 2009 debut album I Dreamed a Dream became the fastest selling UK debut album of all time.
John Brown, footballer who attended Blackburn Academy and subsequently played for Rangers when the club won nine consecutive Scottish League titles.
Angela Constance, Scottish National Party (SNP) politician and ex-Scottish Government Cabinet Minister.
Steven Craig, footballer who, amongst others, played for Falkirk, Motherwell, Aberdeen and Dundee.
Jim Devine, Labour politician who was convicted of fraud and jailed in the United Kingdom parliamentary expenses scandal
Michael Gallagher, Australian paralympic gold medallist.
Alexander Young (engineer), mechanical engineer born in the nineteenth century and who went onto become a politician in the Kingdom of Hawaiʻi.

In British political culture
The town was notably mentioned in a famous speech by MP Tam Dalyell in the House of Commons on 14 November 1977 in which he posed what would become known as the West Lothian question.

References

External links 

 Blackburn Community Web Site
 Blackburn and Seafield Parish Church
 Blackburn Children's Gala Day
 Blackburn Connected Library
 Blackburn United Community Sports Club
 Blackburn United Football Club
 St. Kentigern's Academy 
  Whitburn and Blackburn news 
 Blackburn on Scotland.com
 Blackburn in The Scotsman newspaper
 Scottish Distance Running

Towns in West Lothian